Animonsta Studios Sdn. Bhd. (trading as Monsta since 2014) is a Malaysian animation company that produces creative content for the Malaysian and international market. The company was founded on 15 September 2009 by four former Les' Copaque Production staffs – Mohd Nizam Abd Razak, Muhammad Anas Abdul Aziz, Mohd Safwan Abd Karim and Kee Yong Pin.

Situated in Cyberjaya, Animonsta was awarded MSC Malaysia status in 2011.

History

The founders of Animonsta have experience in creating animated 3D films and blockbuster animations. Through combined knowledge and previously gained experience, they founded Animonsta Studios with the goal of bringing wholesome content with a local touch to both local and international audiences.

Their first product, BoBoiBoy is about BoBoiBoy and his friends' adventures in battling aliens who are trying to invade Earth for its cocoa beans. The original run of BoBoiBoy consisted of 3 seasons with a total of 52 episodes. This was followed by the full-length theatrical release, BoBoiBoy: The Movie, and later a re-branding of the series (still ongoing) titled BoBoiBoy Galaxy which features the same but a slightly older cast of characters in a larger interplanetary setting. While the franchise is aimed at children and teenagers, the content is suitable for the entire family to enjoy together.

The company has announced a sequel to BoBoiBoy: The Movie, and an original new animated series titled MechAmato, both of which are planned for release in 2019.

Filmography

Television series
 BoBoiBoy
 BoBoiBoy Galaxy
 Fly With Yaya
 Mechamato
 Papa & Pipi

Movies
 BoBoiBoy: The Movie
 BoBoiBoy Movie 2
 Mechamato Movie

References

External links
  Monsta's Official Website
  Monsta's News Page
  Monsta's Online Store
 
 Monsta's Comic Page

 
2009 establishments in Malaysia
Malaysian animation studios
Film production companies of Malaysia
Companies based in Sepang
Entertainment companies established in 2009
Malaysian companies established in 2009
MSC Malaysia
Privately held companies of Malaysia